The Church of the Holy Family is a Roman Catholic parish church under the authority of the Roman Catholic Archdiocese of New York, located in Staten Island, New York City. The parish was founded in 1966 and is located at 366 Watchogue Road Westerleigh, Staten Island.

References 

Roman Catholic churches in Staten Island